Rashtriya Lok Dal (abbreviated as RLD) (translation: National People's Party) is a political party in India founded by Chaudhary Ajit Singh. He was carrying on the political legacy of his father and former Prime Minister of India, Chaudhary Charan Singh and the original Lok Dal. Chaudhary Ajit Singh was infected with COVID-19 and died during treatment at Medanta Hospital, Gurgaon.

Electoral history
The party has one MLA in Rajasthan Legislative Assembly Dr. Subhash Garg, who is also serving as MoS (I/C) in the Ashok Gehlot led govt. RLD is considered influential in the western region of Uttar Pradesh.

RLD party member 

 National President Jayant Singh
 National General Secretary Girish Chaudhary

2002 Uttar Pradesh Elections 
In 2002, party had two cabinet ministers in chief minister Mayawati's cabinet. From 2003 to 2007, the party had six ministers in the Uttar Pradesh government. The party's official electoral symbol is a hand pump.

2004 Indian General Elections 
In 2004 Lok Sabha elections, RLD contested in alliance with the Samajwadi Party. RLD contested only in the western part of Uttar Pradesh, where they won three seats.

2009 Indian General Elections 
In the 2009 Lok Sabha elections, RLD contested seven seats in western Uttar Pradesh, in an alliance with the Bhartiya Janata Party, and won five seats.

2014 Indian General Elections 
On 12 December 2011, RLD joined the United Progressive Alliance led by Indian National Congress. The party contested on eight constituencies in Uttar Pradesh in 2014 Indian general election as per an arrangement with UPA but lost on all of them. Party chief Ajit Singh who was six term holder from Baghpat seat, lost to BJP candidate Satya Pal Singh. His son Jayant Chaudhary, the incumbent MP from Mathura, lost to BJP candidate Hema Malini too.

2015 Uttar Pradesh Legislative Council Elections 
In January 2015 Uttar Pradesh Legislative Council elections, RLD supported Bahujan Samaj Party (BSP) candidates.

2017 Uttar Pradesh Elections 
In 2017 Uttar Pradesh Legislative Assembly election, it could win only one seat. Later, its lone MLA was expelled from the party.

2018 Rajasthan Elections 
In 2018 Rajasthan Legislative Assembly election the RLD won one seat from Bharatpur Legislative Assembly Constituency. The Party candidate Dr. Subhash Garg won by beating BJP candidate by a margin of over 15500 votes.

2019 Indian General Elections 
In 2019, RLD joined the Grand Alliance made by BSP and SP in Uttar Pradesh for the General Elections 2019. As per the seat-sharing arrangement, RLD got 3 seats Baghpat, Mathura and Muzaffarnagar but lost all of these. Sanjeev Balyan defeated Ajit Singh from Muzaffarnagar constituency and Satyapal Singh defeated Jayant Choudhary from Baghpat constituency while actress Hema Malini defeated Kunwar Singh from Mathura constituency.

Lok Sabha Elections

Legislative Assembly elections

Uttar Pradesh Assembly Elections

MLAs (Vidhan Sabha) 
MLAs in Rajasthan Legislative Assembly:
 Dr. Subhash Garg (Bharatpur)

MLAs in Uttar Pradesh Legislative Assembly:
 Rajpal Singh Baliyan from Budhana
 Persann Chaudhary from Shamli
 Ajay Kumar from Chhaprauli
 Pradeep Kumar Singh from Sadabad
 Ghulam Mohammad from Siwalkhas
 Ashraf Ali Khan from Thana Bhawan
 Chandan Chauhan from Meerapur
 Anil Kumar from Purqazi
 Madan Bhaiya from Khatauli

List of Central Ministers

See also
 Rashtriya Janata Dal
 Lok Dal (Charan)

References

<ref>https://indianexpress.com/article/political-pulse/rld-sp-join-bharat-jodo-yatra-baghpat-up-8361713/ <\ref>

External links 
 

 
Political parties in India
Janata Parivar
Political parties established in 1996
1996 establishments in India
Janata Dal
Bharatiya Lok Dal